Bhuban Majhi is a Bangladeshi film based on the Bangladeshi War of Independence. It was directed and produced by Fakhrul Arefeen Khan, starring the Indian actor Parambrata Chatterjee and Bangladeshi actress Aparna Ghosh. It was released on March 3, 2017.

Bhuban Majhi explores two time periods simultaneously – 1970 to 1971, and 2004 to 2013, Arefin explains. The film opens in 1970, depicting the rise of a rebel in a common man, played by Parambrata, who struggles with his ideals, and ends with the philosophy of Baul Ananda Shai in 2013.

Nahir, played by Parambrata, comes to Kushtia to complete his graduation a few days before the 1970 election. The ongoing countrywide turmoil revolving around the movement for independence in then East Pakistan, and the elections don't seem to move him in the slightest. All he seems to be bothered with is his love for theatre and Farida.

Nahir, like many of us, has many layers to his personality, believes Parambrata. “There is always an element of doubt and hesitation in the mind of a sensible person. Whenever something happens around us, we prefer to mull over it before jumping to conclusions.” The character of Nahir is not any different from that, as he too embodies the contradictory nature of most humans. As a patriot, Nahir feels the urge to take part in the war, but the artist in him wants to attain independence in a peaceful manner.

Cast
 Parambrata Chatterjee as Nadir
 Aparna Ghosh as Farida
 Quazi Nawshaba Ahmed as Elei
 Mamunur Rashid as Boro Hujur
 Maznun Mizan as Mizan
 Salman Muqtadir as Sohel
 Sushoma Sarkar as Nurse
 Lalim Huq as Nahir Shai

See also
Cinema of Bangladesh
Dhallywood

References

External links
 
 
 Official Website

2017 films
Bengali-language Bangladeshi films
Bangladeshi war drama films
Films based on the Bangladesh Liberation War
Films set in the 1970s
2010s Bengali-language films
2017 directorial debut films
Government of Bangladesh grants films